Ronald Leo Lalonde (born October 30, 1952) is a Canadian former professional ice hockey player. He played in the National Hockey League with the Pittsburgh Penguins and Washington Capitals between 1972 and 1979.

Playing career
Lalonde was born in Toronto, Ontario. As a youth, he played in the 1965 Quebec International Pee-Wee Hockey Tournament with the Scarboro Lions minor ice hockey team. He played junior in the Ontario Hockey League before turning professional with the Hershey Bears in 1972–73. He played nine games with the Pittsburgh Penguins that season and made the Penguins' roster the following season. He was traded to the Washington Capitals in December 1974. He would play the rest of his career through the 1979–80 season in the Capitals organization. Lalonde played 397 games in the NHL, scoring 45 goals and 78 assists for 123 points. During his time with the Capitals, he became the first player in franchise history to record a hat trick on March 30, 1975 against the Detroit Red Wings.

Career statistics

Regular season and playoffs

References

External links
 
 Profile at hockeydraftcentral.com

1952 births
Living people
Canadian ice hockey centres
EC Red Bull Salzburg players
Franco-Ontarian people
Hershey Bears players
Peterborough Petes (ice hockey) players
Pittsburgh Penguins draft picks
Pittsburgh Penguins players
Ice hockey people from Toronto
Washington Capitals players